Mahemadavad Kheda Road railway station is a railway station on the Western Railway network in the state of Gujarat, India. Mahemadavad Kheda Road railway station is 18 km far away from Nadiad railway station. Passenger, MEMU and few Express/Superfast trains halt at Mahemadavad Kheda Road railway station. This railway station's nearest city is Kheda.

Mahemadavad is well known for Shri Siddhivinayak Devsthan situated near bank of Vatrak river.

Etymology 
The name of the railway station is Mahemadavad Kheda Road, because railway station is located near Mahemadavad – Kheda Road of Mahemadavad. Mahemadavad - Kheda Road connects Kheda (former administrative capital of Kheda district) and Mahemadavad.

Nearby stations 
Gothaj is the nearest railway station towards Vadodara, whereas Nenpur is the nearest railway station towards Ahmedabad.

Rail 
The following Express/Superfast trains halt at Mahemadavad Kheda Road railway station in both directions:

 19033/34 Valsad - Ahmedabad Gujarat Queen Express
 22959/60 Surat - Jamnagar Intercity Superfast Express
 19215/16 Mumbai Central - Porbandar Saurashtra Express
 19035/36 Vadodara - Ahmedabad Intercity Express
 22953/54 Mumbai Central - Ahmedabad Gujarat Superfast Express
 19217/18 Bandra Terminus - Jamnagar Saurashtra Janta Express
 19165/66 Ahmedabad - Darbhanga Sabarmati Express
 19167/68 Ahmedabad - Varanasi Sabarmati Express
 22927/28 Bandra Terminus - Ahmedabad Lok Shakti Superfast Express
 12901/02 Mumbai Central - Ahmedabad Gujarat Mail
 11463/64 Somnath - Jabalpur Express (via Itarsi)
 11465/66 Somnath - Jabalpur Express (via Bina)
 19309/10 Gandhinagar Capital - Indore Shanti Express

References

See also
 Kheda district

Railway stations in Kheda district
Vadodara railway division